Bergeyella cardium is a bacterium from the genus of Bergeyella so named since it can sometimes be the cause of infective endocarditis.

References 

Flavobacteria
Bacteria described in 2015